Playhouse on the Square is a regional theatre company located in Memphis, Tennessee. It is owned by Circuit Playhouse, Inc., which operates two other Memphis theaters.  While it has its own resident company of professional actors, auditions are still frequently open to the public. The theater has 347 seats on two levels, an orchestra and balcony with boxes, as well as a rooftop terrace, which is open during shows and rented out for private events.

Buildings
Since its founding, Circuit Playhouse, Inc. has acquired multiple theaters in Memphis.

New Building
In January 2010, architect John Morris designed a new building for Playhouse on the Square, located at 66 S. Cooper St., just across from the previous (now The Circuit Playhouse) theater. The new building, which cost 12.5 million dollars and includes a 340-seat theater and rehearsal space  is connected to an office building which houses various internal theater projects, as well as headquarters for nonprofit arts organizations such as Project Green Fork, Indie Memphis, and others. Indie Memphis also uses the theater at Playhouse on the Square for its yearly film festival. The money to create the theater was raised through a series of campaigns, the most notable of which was the "Breaking New Ground" capital campaign, which raised most of the money needed to build the new theater.

The Circuit Playhouse
The Circuit Playhouse is a 218-seat theater located at 51 S. Cooper St., mainly used for smaller productions.

TheatreWorks at the Square
TheatreWorks is a building one block west of The Circuit Playhouse originally built in 1995 to house a variety of small performance groups unable to afford quarters of their own.  Now, emerging artists and performing arts groups may rent the facilities."  There are now two buildings under its operation: Theatreworks at the Square at 2085 Monroe Ave., and The Evergreen Theatre (originally the Ritz movie theatre, built in 1927) at 1705 Poplar Ave. (former location of The Circuit Playhouse). Together they have 2 fully-equipped stages, and 3 rehearsal studios.

Programs & Outreach
Circuit Playhouse, Inc. maintains several education and outreach programs.  The Circuit Playhouse is also home to the Summer Youth Theatre Conservatory, a summer program for children who are interested in learning more about the career of acting.

References

External links
Playhouse on the Square official website
Playhouse on the Square on GoMemphis

Theatres in Tennessee
Buildings and structures in Memphis, Tennessee
Culture of Memphis, Tennessee